Bembropinae is a subfamily of duckbill fishes from the family Percophidae.

Genera
There are two genera within the subfamily Bembropinae:

 Bembrops Steindachner, 1876
 Chrionema Gilbert, 1905

References